East Hazel Crest is a village in Cook County, Illinois, in the United States. It is a south suburb of Chicago. As of the 2020 census, the village population was 1,297.

History
East Hazel Crest was a part of Hazel Crest when it incorporated in 1911 until the Illinois Central Railroad elevated their commuter and mainline tracks above grade, isolating the rural community from the rest of Hazel Crest. The community voted for incorporation into their own village in 1918. The village later annexed a small commercial area and residential subdivision, Bremerton Woods, that lies west of the Illinois Central Railroad where the village administration and Metra station now stand.

Geography
East Hazel Crest is located at  (41.576384, -87.652171).

Surrounding areas
 Harvey
 Hazel Crest    South Holland 
 Hazel Crest   Thornton
 Homewood    Homewood
 Homewood

Demographics
As of the 2020 census there were 1,297 people, 575 households, and 356 families residing in the village. The racial makeup of the village was 57.98% African American, 25.60% White, 0.23% Native American, 0.31% Asian, 0.00% Pacific Islander, 7.09% from other races, and 8.79% from two or more races. Hispanic or Latino of any race were 16.11% of the population.

There were 575 households, out of which 32.87% had children under the age of 18 living with them, 34.78% were married couples living together, 21.57% had a female householder with no husband present, and 38.09% were non-families. 36.00% of all households were made up of individuals, and 14.61% had someone living alone who was 65 years of age or older. The average household size was 3.54 and the average family size was 2.62.

The village's age distribution consisted of 15.9% under the age of 18, 14.2% from 18 to 24, 18% from 25 to 44, 30.6% from 45 to 64, and 21.0% who were 65 years of age or older. The median age was 46.3 years. For every 100 females, there were 79.6 males. For every 100 females age 18 and over, there were 74.1 males.

The median income for a household in the village was $50,583, and the median income for a family was $68,594. Males had a median income of $38,929 versus $31,902 for females. The per capita income for the village was $29,269. About 9.0% of families and 9.0% of the population were below the poverty line, including 4.6% of those under age 18 and 11.4% of those age 65 or over.

Note: the US Census treats Hispanic/Latino as an ethnic category. This table excludes Latinos from the racial categories and assigns them to a separate category. Hispanics/Latinos can be of any race.

Government
East Hazel Crest is in Illinois's 2nd congressional district.

References

External links
 Village of East Hazel Crest official website

Villages in Illinois
Villages in Cook County, Illinois
Chicago metropolitan area
Majority-minority cities and towns in Cook County, Illinois